Douglas Thomas Hickey is an American businessman and diplomat who has served as the United States ambassador to Finland since 2022.

Education 
Hickey earned a Bachelor of Arts degree in economics in 1977 from Siena College.

Career 
From 1989 to 1994, Hickey was the president of Metropolitan Fiber Systems. He later joined GlobalCenter, a web hosting service, before it was acquired by Exodus Communications. From 1998 until his resignation in 2001, Hickey was the president and CEO of Critical Path, Inc. From 2000 to 2010, Hickey was a partner at Hummer Winblad Venture Partners in San Francisco. He was later the president and CEO of BinWise, Inc., a company that provides software used to track beer, spirits, and wine inventory to businesses in the food and beverage industry.  In 2014, Hickey was appointed to serve as the United States Ambassador and commissioner general to Expo Milano by President Barack Obama.

Ambassador to Finland
Despite initial reports that President Joe Biden was considering to nominate him as Ambassador to Italy and San Marino, he was eventually nominated as Ambassador to Finland on October 8, 2021.

Hearings were held on Hickey's nomination before the Senate Foreign Relations Committee on March 3, 2022. The committee favorably reported his nomination to the Senate floor on March 23, 2022. Hickey was confirmed by the entire Senate via voice vote on March 24, 2022. He presented his credentials to President Sauli Niinistö on May 11, 2022.

Awards and recognitions 
In 2016, Hickey received an honorary doctorate degree from Siena College.

Personal life 
Hickey and his wife, Dawn Ross, have been prominent financial supporters of Democratic presidential candidates, including John Kerry, Barack Obama, Hillary Clinton, and Joe Biden.

References 

Living people
Siena College alumni
Businesspeople from California
California Democrats
American venture capitalists
Year of birth missing (living people)
Ambassadors of the United States to Finland